Xylocopa auripennis, or Xylocopa (Biluna) auripennis, is a species of carpenter bee. It is widely distributed in South Asian countries, and Southeast Asian countries.

Subspecies
 Xylocopa (Biluna) auripennis iridipennis Lepeletier, 1841
 Xylocopa (Biluna) auripennis caspari van der Vecht, 1953

References 

 http://animaldiversity.org/accounts/Xylocopa_auripennis/classification/

Further reading 

Ruggiero M. (project leader), Ascher J. et al. (2013). ITIS Bees: World Bee Checklist (version Sep 2009). In: Species 2000 & ITIS Catalogue of Life, 11 March 2013 (Roskov Y., Kunze T., Paglinawan L., Orrell T., Nicolson D., Culham A., Bailly N., Kirk P., Bourgoin T., Baillargeon G., Hernandez F., De Wever A., eds). Digital resource at www.catalogueoflife.org/col/. Species 2000: Reading, UK.
John Ascher, Connal Eardley, Terry Griswold, Gabriel Melo, Andrew Polaszek, Michael Ruggiero, Paul Williams, Ken Walker, and Natapot Warrit.

auripennis
Hymenoptera of Asia
Fauna of Southeast Asia
Insects described in 1841